Woodgate is part of Birmingham, between Bartley Green and Harborne. It is split up into 3 parts, Woodgate Valley South (also known as South Woodgate), which is the gateway to Harborne. Woodgate Valley, which is next to Bartley Green, and Woodgate Valley North, often referred as part of Quinton.

External links
1884 Ordnance Survey map of Woodgate

Areas of Birmingham, West Midlands